"Treat Me Like a Stranger" is a song written by Michael Bonagura and Peter McCann, and recorded by American country music group Baillie & the Boys.  It was released in January 1991 as the third single from the album The Lights of Home.  The song reached #18 on the Billboard Hot Country Singles & Tracks chart.

Chart performance

References

1990 songs
1991 singles
Baillie & the Boys songs
Songs written by Michael Bonagura
Songs written by Peter McCann
Song recordings produced by Kyle Lehning
RCA Records singles